Gumi Civic Stadium (구미시민운동장 주경기장) is a Multi-purpose stadium located in Gumi, Gyeongsangbuk-do, South Korea. It has a capacity of 35,000 and was built in 1984.

External links
 World Stadiums

Football venues in South Korea
Multi-purpose stadiums in South Korea
Sports venues in North Gyeongsang Province